The 1943–44 Ranji Trophy was the tenth season of the Ranji Trophy. Western India won their only title defeating Bengal in the final.

This season could be considered as the arbitrary starting point of high scoring in Indian domestic cricket that would last till the end of the decade. In the final of the Bombay Pentangular in early December 1943, Vijay Merchant and Vijay Hazare scored 250* and 309. It was the prelude to Merchant setting a new Ranji and Indian first class record of 359* for Bombay against Maharashtra between 31 December 1943, and 2 January 1944, at the Brabourne Stadium in Bombay.

Highlights
 The Bombay-Maharashtra match set several national records.
 Bombay made 735, the highest score in Indian first class cricket bettering 703 by Bengal Cyclone XI in 1942-43. The previous Ranji record was 675 by Maharashtra v Bombay in 1940-41
 Vijay Merchant's 359* was the highest individual score in India. Vijay Hazare's 316* for Maharashtra v Baroda in 1939-40 was the previous Ranji and first class record.
 Merchant and Rusi Modi's partnership of 371 was a national record for the sixth wicket. As of 2014, it is bettered only by 417 between Wridhiman Saha and Laxmi Ratan Shukla for Bengal v Assam in 2010-11
 Vijay Merchant's season batting average of 276.50 is the highest by any batsman scoring over 500 runs.
Herbert Barritt captained Western India to the title. He was the third Englishman to captain a Ranji winning team, after Bert Wensley of Nawanagar in 1936-37 and Tom Longfield of Bengal in 1938–39.

Zonal Matches

West Zone

East Zone

North Zone

South Zone

Inter-Zonal Knockout matches

Final

Summary of first ten seasons

Scorecards and averages
Cricketarchive

References

External links

1944 in Indian cricket
Indian domestic cricket competitions